Linchester Mill is a historic grist mill located at Preston in Caroline County, Maryland, United States. The original mill was built at the site in about 1682; the current structure was erected in approximately 1840 and is a -story frame building sided in red-painted weatherboard and roofed with raised-seam metal. It is four bays long and two bays deep, with a two-story lean-to addition.  Then known as Langrell's Mill, operations ceased in 1974 but currently houses a museum collection of milling machinery dating from the 19th century to the mid-20th century.

It was listed on the National Register of Historic Places in 2009 after renovations began in 2004.

References

External links
, at Maryland Historical Trust

Grinding mills in Maryland
Greek Revival architecture in Maryland
Industrial buildings completed in 1840
Buildings and structures in Caroline County, Maryland
National Register of Historic Places in Caroline County, Maryland
Grinding mills on the National Register of Historic Places in Maryland